Ebbw Vale North is a community in Blaenau Gwent, South Wales. It includes the north of Ebbw Vale and was formed in 2010 from part of that community. The population in 2011 was 4,561.

References 

Communities in Blaenau Gwent
Ebbw Vale